The Peel P50 is a three-wheeled microcar originally made from 1962 to 1965 by the Peel Engineering Company on the Isle of Man, and then from 2011 to present. It was listed in the 2010 Guinness World Records as the smallest production car ever made. The original model has no reverse gear, but a handle at the rear allows the very lightweight car to be maneuvered physically when required.

Designed as a city car, it was advertised in the 1960s as capable of seating "one adult and a shopping bag." The vehicle's only door was on its left side and equipment included a single windscreen wiper and one headlight. Standard colours were Daytona White, Dragon Red, and Dark Blue. The 1963 model retailed for £199 when new (about £6,600 in 2019, or US$8,500). The company produced 50 P50s, of which 27 are known to still exist, one of which was sold for a record US$176,000 at a Sotheby's auction in March 2016.

In 2010 Peel Engineering Ltd. in England reinstated manufacturing of the P50 and Trident models from its premises in Sutton-in-Ashfield, England. Externally this car is very similar to the original, with the same dimensions and kerb weight as the original, but with mechanical differences in the suspension, steering, and drive-train, and a fully functioning reverse gear, ensuring they are road-legal under today's rules. Production included petrol models with a 49 cc four-stroke engine and electric models with an electric moped motor and gelled-electrolyte batteries.

Statistics 
The Peel P50's diminutive size and width means that it can quite easily fit through doorways and enter buildings, as demonstrated by Jeremy Clarkson during a sequence on a 2007 episode of Top Gear, where a blue P50 was driven through the BBC's Television Centre.

1962–1966 

Consequently, turning in a confined area could be achieved only by pushing, or lifting the car using the handle on the rear and physically pulling it round.

In 1963, as a publicity stunt, a Peel P50 was taken to the top of Blackpool Tower in the lift and driven around the observation balcony.

At least one prototype, the Peel P55 Saloon Scooter, has also survived. Unlike the production Peel P50 (along with all developments and replicas thereof), this prototype used the less stable layout of a single wheel at the front and two at the back.

Approximately 47 Peel P50s were sold at £299 each.

Since 2011 
In 2011 businessmen Gary Hillman and Faizal Khan went to the Dragons' Den asking for £80,000. They got the investment and started a new company to put their revised models into production. Three replica models were available initially: Gas, Eco and Fun. The line was later reduced to two: the Petrol and Electric models. These are hand-built to order in Sutton-in-Ashfield by Micro Car Specialists for the domestic and export markets.

In 2018 it was reported that Peel Engineering sells around fifteen P50s annually, plus ten or so continuations of its bigger sister, the two-seat bubblecar Peel Trident. The conventional piston engined P50 is more requested in the UK, priced at £14,879 – whereas greater demand for the Peel comes from the US, where the electric model (at £13,679) helps owners to comply with emissions regulations.

Legal status 

The original Peel P50 has always been road-legal in the UK, though the many replica versions are classed as Kitcars and as such, require MSVA inspection for 3 wheel Moped or 4 wheel Quadricycle.   It is street-legal in the US. Cars were exported to other countries, sometimes being classified as a moped (e.g. the P50 that went to Finland). 
In the Netherlands there are two original Tridents registered as tricycles, but the Trident replica with the 50cc engine and  top speed was registered as a moped. In Amsterdam the Ripley's Believe It Or Not museum has one. Due to local traffic rules it may not be driven on the cycle path. In Wassenaar the Louwman Museum had an original P50 on display; it was on the poster of the "Dwarfcar" themed exhibition.

See also 
BMW Isetta
Reliant Robin
Smart Fortwo

References

External links 

 Peel Engineering Ltd.
 P50CARS.com order form
 Peel P50 Factory Movie
 Peel Cars photos from the 2005 reunion in Peel of cars from all round the world
 Peel Owner's Club
 Alex Orchin:  The UK in the world's smallest car

Microcars
Three-wheeled motor vehicles
Peel Engineering Company
Peel vehicles
Rear-wheel-drive vehicles
Cars introduced in 1962
Peel, Isle of Man